Telser is a surname. Notable people with this surname include:

 Daniel Telser (born 1970), Liechtenstein footballer
 Karin Telser (born 1966), Italian figure skater
 Lester G. Telser (born 1931), American economist
 Martin Telser (born 1978), Liechtenstein footballer

See also
 Tesler